Uruguay competed at the 1992 Summer Paralympics in Barcelona and Madrid, Spain. 

At the Barcelona Games, the 2 competitors from Uruguay did not win any medals. medal table.

But in Madrid games, the Uruguayan delegation won 15 medals, 5 of gold, 4 of silver and 5 of bronze, making the best participation of its history. Since then, the country has never won another gold medal in the competition.

See also 
 Uruguay at the Paralympics
 Uruguay at the 1992 Summer Olympics

References 

1992
1992 in Uruguayan sport
Nations at the 1992 Summer Paralympics